Father Vicente de Santa María (1742 – July 16, 1806) was a Spanish Franciscan priest who accompanied explorer Juan de Ayala on the first Spanish naval entry aboard the San Carlos into the San Francisco Bay.  Born in the village of Aras in Navarre Province, Spain, Santa Maria moved to Mexico City to attend the Colegio de San Fernando seminary in 1769.  Santa Maria wrote detailed first-hand accounts of the journey of the San Carlos and of the indigenous inhabitants of the San Francisco Bay Area prior to Spanish colonization.  He later served at Mission San Francisco de Asis in San Francisco and Mission San Buenaventura in Ventura, California, where he died in 1806.

References

1742 births
1806 deaths
People from Navarre
Californios
Spanish Franciscans
Priests of the Spanish missions in California
Spanish Roman Catholic missionaries
Franciscan missionaries
18th-century Mexican Roman Catholic priests
19th-century American Roman Catholic priests
Roman Catholic missionaries in New Spain